North Texas Hindu Mandir (NTHM), is a Hindu Mandir in Dallas, Texas and is one of the many Hindu Temples located in the Dallas-Fort Worth Metroplex. Its located on 10309 Baronne Cir, Dallas, TX 75218.

History
In 1992, Indo-Caribbean Hindu Immigrants in the Dallas-Fort Worth Area established CHANT, Caribbean Hindu Association of North Texas. In 2002, CHANT purchased an old synagogue in the Old Lake Highlands Neighborhood of Dallas. They repainted the interior and installed several Hindu Murtis and in 2002, it opened as a non sectarian Hindu Temple for Hindus from all over the world. On April 15, 2015, several members of Mara Salvatrucha vandalized the temple by drawing '666' on the Temple doors and various symbols of Devil Worship were sprayed on the walls of the Temple. In response, the Hindu Temple installed several cameras around the premises and a fence around the temple to prevent further attacks from happening in the future.

Design
Due to the influence of various Hindu Groups from around the world, the Hindu Temple's interior has Hindu Deities in a line along the wall, barely raised above the floor. There are no pedestals so devotees can touch the Murtis.

Charity
NTHM's Youth Group facilitates various drives for charities in the area such as the North Texas Food Bank.

References

Buildings and structures in Dallas County, Texas
Hinduism in the United States
Religious buildings and structures completed in 2002
1992 establishments in Texas
Religious organizations established in 1992